Vincent C Y Ho (born 25 May 1990) is a horse racing jockey. He made an impressive start to his riding career with 10 wins in his first season in 2009/10. He became Hong Kong's champion apprentice with 39 wins in 2010/11.
 In 2012/13 he rode 28 winners, and in 2013/14 season he has notched 22 for a HK total of 116.

Performance

Major wins
 Hong Kong
 Champions Mile - (2) - Southern Legend (2020), Golden Sixty (2021)
 Queen Elizabeth II Cup - (1) - Loves Only You (2021)
 Hong Kong Mile - (2) - Golden Sixty (2020, 2021)
 Hong Kong Derby - (1) - Golden Sixty (2020)
 Hong Kong Classic Mile - (1) - Golden Sixty (2020)
 Hong Kong Classic Cup - (1) - Golden Sixty (2020)
 Hong Kong Stewards' Cup - (2) - Golden Sixty (2021, 2023)
 Hong Kong Gold Cup - (2) - Golden Sixty (2021, 2023)
 Centenary Sprint Cup - (1) - Stronger (2022)

References

External links 
The Hong Kong Jockey Club

Hong Kong jockeys
1990 births
Living people